yet2.com is a global open innovation consulting company and technology marketplace founded in February 1999. The company is based around the idea of matching large companies with smaller companies, inventors, startups, and academic institutions, as well as allowing all types of technologies to be bought and sold on an online marketplace. Shortly after the company's founding in 1999, it became the largest global market for patents.

History
yet2.com was founded in 1999 by Ben duPont and Chris De Bleser. DuPont was attempting to sell a new technology that he had developed. Chris De Bleser was in a similar situation at Polaroid. Originally intended to be an online marketplace only, yet2 changed strategies to provide more consulting services and offline project work. Since its founding the company has provided services to Fortune 500 and Global 2000 companies including Boeing, Ford, Monsanto and NTT among others.

Until 2016, yet2 also included yet2Ventures, a secondary investment firm run by DuPont and Phil Stern. Later that year, yet2Ventures became Chartline Capital Partners and effectively separated operations from yet2.com.

Funding
The company was founded with original investments from Venrock Capital, Procter & Gamble, DuPont, Honeywell, Caterpillar, NTT Leasing, Bayer and Siemens raising over $24 million.

See also
 Technology Scouting
 Open Innovation

References

Further reading
 
  (Source preview link).

External links
 
 Yet2.com at NASA

Management consulting firms of the United States
Consulting firms established in 1999
Financial services companies established in 1999
Crowdsourcing
Venture capital firms of the United States
Open innovation intermediaries
American companies established in 1999
Financial services companies of the United States